The Heimbach Group is a supplier of textiles for the paper manufacturing, environmental technology and other industries. Headquartered in Düren, Germany, with production sites located throughout Europe, Heimbach Group produces industrial textiles and filtration materials for various applications.

Organization
Heimbach Group is headquartered in Düren. It maintains paper machine textile manufacturing sites in 
 Düren;
 Olten, Switzerland;
 Burgos, Spain;
 Neu-Moresnet, Belgium
 Manchester, England
 Suzhou, China.

Heimbach also manufactures filtration media in Düren, Germany  and Boras, Sweden. Its technical textile division is headquartered in Neu-Moresnet, with production in Rochdale, England, Merone, Italy and Lörrach, Germany.

History
The Heimbach Group was founded in 1811 by Thomas Josef Heimbach, who was mayor of Düren  (1848-1853).  In 1871, they acquired a local manufacturer named Krutzmühle, and began specializing in the production of felt for paper-making machines.  By 1900, they were the largest producer of such felt in Europe.  In 1904, a fire destroyed most of the facilities, leading to a major reconstruction.  In 1924, Heimbach acquired the Swiss-based Munzinger AG.

Like many German companies, Heimbach Group was decimated by the effects of World War II.  After the War, the company rebuilt and continued expansion.

During the 1960s Heimbach made contributions to the advanced needling manufacturing technique. In 1969 Heimbach founded Heimbach Ibérica S.A. based in Spain. Just one year later, Heimbach incorporated Bruch&Cie. based in Belgium, which is today known as Heimbach Specialities AG. Following this, Heimbach founded the companies Swiss Wire Ireland Ltd. (Ireland) and the Atlanta Felt Company (USA) in 1974 and 1980 respectively.

In 1991 Heimbach entered into a partnership with the Canadian JWI Group and bought the English company CH Johnson Ltd., which is today better known as Heimbach UK Ltd. 

In 2001 Heimbach initially divested its filtration division as a company affiliate followed to be an independent acting company in 2007 located at the company premises in Mariaweiler, Düren. Heimbach Filtration currently employs approx. 100 people and achieved and estimated turnover of €20 million in 2012. 

In 2006 the sales and marketing company Heimbach Asia (Singapore) Pte. Ltd. was founded in Singapore in order to serve the emerging markets in Asia

Heimbach achieved the global market leadership in the field of woven press pads with application in the wood processing industry, e.g. furniture and laminate flooring, by acquiring  Marathon Belting Ltd. based in Manchester, UK.  

In 2008 Heimbach further extended its market position in the filtration and technical textiles product segments through additional company acquisitions in South America and Europe. In 2009 Heimbach inaugurated a new manufacturing facility in Suzhou, China, producing paper machine textiles for the entire Asian-Pacific market.

Companies based in North Rhine-Westphalia
Manufacturing companies established in 1811
Manufacturing companies of Germany
Düren (district)